IHF may stand for:

 Integration host factor, a bacterial DNA-binding protein
 International Handball Federation, international governing body of handball
 Iraqi Handball Federation, governing body of handball in Iraq
 International H.K.D. Federation, international governing body of hapkido
 International Hockey Federation, international governing body of field hockey
 Indian Hockey Federation, governing body of field hockey in India